Christian Chaubet (born 19 July 1961) is a former French racing cyclist. He rode in three editions of the Tour de France and one edition of the Giro d'Italia.

References

External links

1961 births
Living people
French male cyclists
Sportspeople from Toulouse
Cyclists from Occitania (administrative region)